94 Ceti (HD 19994) is a trinary star system approximately 73 light-years away in the constellation Cetus.

94 Ceti A is a yellow-white dwarf star with about 1.3 times the mass of the Sun while 94 Ceti B and C are red dwarf stars.

An infrared excess has been detected around the primary, most likely indicating the presence of a circumstellar disk at a radius of 95 AU. The temperature of this dust is 40 K.

Stellar system
This system is a hierarchical triple star system with 94 Ceti A being orbited by 94 Ceti BC, a pair of M dwarfs, in 2000 years. 94 Ceti B and C meanwhile orbit each other in a 1-year orbit.

Planetary system
On 7 August 2000, a planet was announced by the Geneva Extrasolar Planet Search team as a result of radial velocity measurements taken with the Swiss 1.2-metre Leonhard Euler Telescope at La Silla Observatory in Chile. It is most stable if its inclination is either 65 or 115,  ± 3.

See also
 79 Ceti
 81 Ceti
 Lists of exoplanets

References

External links
 SolStation: 94 Ceti 2 + orbits
 94 Ceti by Professor Jim Kaler.

Cetus (constellation)
F-type main-sequence stars
M-type main-sequence stars
Binary stars
Ceti, 94
019994
014954
0962
Durchmusterung objects
0128
Planetary systems with one confirmed planet